Le Papillon may refer to:
 Le Papillon (ballet), an 1860 ballet by Marie Taglioni and Jacques Offenbach
 Le Papillon (film) or The Butterfly, a 2002 film by Philippe Muyl
 Le Papillon (restaurant), a French restaurant in San Jose, California
 Le Papillon des étoiles, a novel by French author Bernard Werber.